Alexander Ageevich Abaza (Александр Агеевич Абаза 1821–1895) was one of the most liberal of the advisors of Alexander II of Russia. He served as minister of finance from October 27, 1880, to May 6, 1881, and unsuccessfully urged the tsar to transform Imperial Russia into a constitutional monarchy. After Alexander II's assassination and the accession of Alexander III, reformers like Abaza were removed from power. In his career he also served as State Comptroller (1871–1874) and as chairman of State Council's Department of the State Economy (1874–1880 and 1884–1892). He was a recipient of the Order of the White Eagle, the Order of Saint Vladimir, the Order of Saint Anna and the Order of Saint Stanislaus.

References
Notes

Bibliography
Polunov, Alexander (2005) Russia in the Nineteenth Century: Autocracy, Reform, and Social Change. Armonk, NY: M.E. Sharpe. 

1821 births
1895 deaths
People from Okulovsky District
People from Vyshnevolotsky Uyezd
Nobility from the Russian Empire
Politicians of the Russian Empire
Members of the State Council (Russian Empire)
Honorary members of the Saint Petersburg Academy of Sciences
19th-century people from the Russian Empire
Recipients of the Order of the White Eagle (Russia)
Recipients of the Order of St. Vladimir, 2nd class
Recipients of the Order of St. Anna, 1st class
Recipients of the Order of Saint Stanislaus (Russian), 1st class
Burials at Tikhvin Cemetery
Recipients of the Order of St. Vladimir, 1st class
Active Privy Councillor (Russian Empire)
People of the Caucasian War